

Administrative and municipal divisions

Note on the types of the inhabited localities
In the Republic of Buryatia, ulus is a type of rural locality, along with "selo" and "settlement".

References

 
Buryatia